is a Japanese judoka. Sone's favorite techniques are Tai Otoshi, Ouchi Gari She competed at the 2020 Summer Olympics, winning a silver medal in mixed team, and gold medal in Women's +78 kg

Career
Sone started Judo at the age of 7, following her three brothers. In April 2013, she went on to Tanushimaru Junior High School. In August 2015, Sone won the World Judo Championships Cadets and the National Junior High School Championships. In April 2016, she began studying at Nanchiku High School. In March 2017, she won the National High School Championships. She won the Inter-High School Championships in August 2017. In October 2017, Sone won the World Judo Championships Juniors(+78 kg weight class). In April 2018, she won the All-Japan Judo Championships. In August 2018, Sone won the Asian Games.

Sone won the gold medal in the women's +78 kg event, and silver in the mixed team event, at the 2020 Summer Olympics held in Tokyo, Japan.

References

External links
 
 
 

2000 births
Living people
Japanese female judoka
Sportspeople from Fukuoka Prefecture
World judo champions
Judoka at the 2018 Asian Games
Judoka at the 2020 Summer Olympics
Asian Games gold medalists for Japan
Asian Games medalists in judo
Medalists at the 2018 Asian Games
Olympic judoka of Japan
Olympic gold medalists for Japan
Olympic silver medalists for Japan
Medalists at the 2020 Summer Olympics
Olympic medalists in judo
21st-century Japanese women